Emily Dickinson Blake "Blakey" Vermeule (born July 14, 1966) is an American scholar of eighteenth-century British literature and theory of mind. She is a Professor of English at Stanford University.

Biography
Vermeule is the daughter of classicist Emily Vermeule and former Museum of Fine Arts curator Cornelius Clarkson Vermeule III. Her brother, Adrian Vermeule, is a professor at Harvard Law School. Her wife is Terry Castle, also a professor of English at Stanford.

Her research interests include British literature from 1660–1800, critical theory, major British poets, post-Colonial fiction, the history of the novel, the cognitive underpinnings of fiction, and human evolutionary psychology.  Her recent scholarship has focused on Darwinian literary studies. 
Vermeule previously taught at Northwestern University and Yale University.

In 2015, Vermeule co-founded the book review The New Rambler.

Education
Ph.D. English Literature, University of California, Berkeley, 1995 B.A. English, summa cum laude, Yale University, 1988

Works
Action versus Contemplation: Why an Ancient Debate Still Matters (University of Chicago Press, 2018) 
The Party of Humanity: Writing Moral Psychology in Eighteenth-Century Britain (2000) 
Why Do We Care about Literary Characters? (2009)

References
 

Stanford University Department of English faculty
Living people
1966 births
Vermeule family
Moral psychology
American academics of English literature
The New Rambler
People from Cambridge, Massachusetts
LGBT academics
American LGBT writers